Arthurs-Johnson House located at 6925 Ohio River Boulevard in Ben Avon, Allegheny County, Pennsylvania, was built in 1873.  The house was added to the List of Pittsburgh History and Landmarks Foundation Historic Landmarks in 1981.

References

Houses in Allegheny County, Pennsylvania
Houses completed in 1873
Pittsburgh History & Landmarks Foundation Historic Landmarks